is a Japanese retired professional wrestler and professional golfer better known as . She began competing in All Japan Women's Pro-Wrestling (AJW) as a teenager under the ring name Bull Nakano. As a wrestler she was a villain, who often teamed with her mentor Dump Matsumoto. In Japan, she held several of AJW's singles and tag team championships. After being phased out by the company in the early 1990s, she traveled to North America, where she first competed in Mexico's Consejo Mundial de Lucha Libre (CMLL), becoming its first World Women's Champion. In 1994, she made her way to the World Wrestling Federation (WWF), where she had feuded with Alundra Blayze over the WWF Women's Championship. After holding the title once, she also competed in World Championship Wrestling (WCW). In 1998, Nakano began competing as a professional golfer, and in 2006, she joined a tour with the Ladies Professional Golf Association (LPGA).

Professional wrestling career

All Japan Women's Pro-Wrestling (1983–1996)
Nakano's career as a professional wrestler began in All Japan Women's Pro-Wrestling (AJW) organization in Japan when she was 15 years old. After winning the AJW Junior Championship at the age of 16 in 1984, her ring name was changed to Bull Nakano. In July 1985, she won the AJW Championship, which she held for the next three years. Meanwhile, she teamed with Dump Matsumoto—who was also her mentor—as a pair of villains. With Matsumoto as her partner, Nakano won the WWWA World Tag Team Championship in August 1986. Nakano and Matsumoto also wrestled for the World Wrestling Federation in 1986 against the team of Velvet McIntyre and Dawn Marie Johnston.

After Matsumoto's retirement, Nakano won the WWWA World Tag Team Championship a second and third time, with Condor Saito in 1987 and Grizzly Iwamoto in 1988. As a singles wrestler, she won the 1988 Japan Grand Prix tournament in June. One year later in June 1989, she also defeated Mitsuko Nishiwaki to win AJW's All Pacific Championship, which she lost to Noriyo Tateno in November. Several months later in January 1990, Nakano won a tournament final to win the vacant WWWA World Single Championship. She held the title for nearly three years, before dropping it to Aja Kong in November 1992. Afterward, AJW's use of Nakano in storylines and matches decreased.

Consejo Mundial de Lucha Libre (1992–1993)
After she stopped working for AJW, Nakano traveled to Mexico in June 1992, where she was a finalist in a 12-woman battle royal and later defeated Lola González to become Consejo Mundial de Lucha Libre's first World Women's Champion. She lost the title to Xóchitl Hamada in March 1993.

World Wrestling Federation (1994–1995)
She then made her way to the United States and competed for the World Wrestling Federation (WWF) once again. Debuting as an associate of Luna Vachon, Nakano competed against the WWF Women's Champion, Alundra Blayze in August 1994 at SummerSlam, but failed to win the title. Nakano eventually defeated Blayze for the title on November 20, 1994 in Tokyo at the Big Egg Wrestling Universe event. Nakano held the title for approximately five months, until losing it back to Blayze on the April 3, 1995 episode of Raw ending her reign at 134 days. The WWF had planned on bringing in Bertha Faye to feud with Nakano while Blayze got plastic surgery on her nose and breasts, but Nakano was found in possession of cocaine and quickly fired from the company.

World Championship Wrestling (1995–1996)
In 1995, Nakano also traveled to North Korea, where she was part of the joint New Japan Pro-Wrestling/World Championship Wrestling (WCW) Collision in Korea event in Pyongyang that set a record for attendance at a professional wrestling event with 150,000 spectators. At the event, Nakano and Akira Hokuto defeated Manami Toyota and Mariko Yoshida. Later that year, she competed at WCW's World War 3 pay-per-view event, teaming with Akira Hokuto to defeat the team of Cutie Suzuki and Mayumi Ozaki. Nakano—with Sonny Onoo as her manager—continued her feud with Blayze, who was now known as Madusa, at WCW's Hog Wild event in August 1996; Madusa defeated Nakano in the match with the stipulation that she was then allowed to destroy Nakano's motorcycle. In subsequent years, Madusa called Nakano "a good-hearted person" and an "incredible talent", with whom she had some of her best matches.

Retirement
Due to injuries, Bull Nakano retired from professional wrestling in 1997. On January 8, 2012, Nakano produced her own professional wrestling event, titled "Empress", which saw her recreate her most famous matches with her old opponents. The event ended with Nakano's official retirement ceremony, though she had not been an active wrestler for several years.

Rise Wrestling (2017)
It was announced at Rise Wrestling's Bellatrix 26/Rise 4 event on September 15, 2017, that Bull Nakano would join the promotion as a facilitator, along with Cheerleader Melissa and Madusa, Nakano's former rival. Nakano turned heel during her appearance at Rise 6 on December 1, when she attacked Melissa during her match against Kikyo, and formed a modified version of her heel faction, Gokumon-To; aligning with Kikyo, Dynamite DiDi, and Kris Wolf. Nakano appeared later in the event as a heel manager for Kris Wolf in her match against Shotzi Blackheart (who had Madusa in her corner), and provided interference that led to Wolf defeating Blackheart.

Golf career
Nakano became a professional golfer in 1998. In November 2004, Nakano played in the Futures Tour Qualifying Tournament in Florida, but ended the tournament in 250th place of 251. The following year, she ended the tournament in 261st place of 271. As a result, she failed to qualify for the Ladies Professional Golf Association (LPGA). Nakano later qualified for the LPGA and joined the Duramed Futures Tour in January 2006.

Championships and accomplishments
All Japan Women's Pro-Wrestling
AJW Championship (1 time)
AJW Junior Championship (1 time)
All Pacific Championship (1 time)
WWWA World Single Championship (1 time)
WWWA World Tag Team Championship (3 times) – with Dump Matsumoto (1), Condor Saito (1), and Grizzly Iwamoto (1)
Japan Grand Prix (1988)
Tag League the Best (1985) – with Dump Matsumoto
AJW Hall of Fame (1998)
Consejo Mundial de Lucha Libre
CMLL World Women's Championship (1 time)
Wrestling Observer Newsletter
Wrestling Observer Newsletter Hall of Fame (Class of 2001)
World Wrestling Federation
WWF Women's Championship (1 time)
 Slammy Award (1 time)
 Most Devastating (1994)

References

External links

Online World of Wrestling profile 

1968 births
Japanese female golfers
Japanese female professional wrestlers
Living people
People from Kawaguchi, Saitama
Sportspeople from Orlando, Florida
Sportspeople from Saitama Prefecture
WWF/WWE Women's Champions
Golfers from Orlando, Florida
20th-century professional wrestlers
CMLL World Women's Champions